Chelvanayakam or Selvanayagam is a Tamil male given name. Due to the Tamil tradition of using patronymic surnames it may also be a surname for males and females.

Notable people

Given name
 P. R. Selvanayagam (born 1936), Sri Lankan politician
 S. Selvanayagam (1932–1979), Ceylonese geographer and academic
 S. J. V. Chelvanayakam (1898–1977), Ceylonese politician

Surname
 Antony Selvanayagam (born 1935), Malaysian priest
 Chelvanayakam Kanaganayakam (1952–2014), Canadian academic

See also
 
 
 
 

Tamil masculine given names